As (invalidly) established by Tutt in 1906, Langia refers to the butterfly genus Leptotes.

Langia is a genus of moths in the family Sphingidae.

Species
 Langia zenzeroides Moore, 1872
Langia zenzeroides formosana

Smerinthini
Moth genera
Taxa named by Frederic Moore